Poss's scorpionfish (Scorpaenopsis possi) is a species of venomous marine ray-finned fish belonging to the family Scorpaenidae, the scorpionfishes. It is found in the Indo-Pacific region. It occasionally makes its way into the aquarium trade.

Taxonomy
Poss's scorpionfish was first formally described in 2001 by the American ichthyologists John E. Randall and William N. Eschmeyer with the type locality given as Pitcairn Island. The specific name honours the American ichthyologist Stuart G. Poss.

Description
Poss's scorpionfish has a large head, large eyes and large pectoral fins the snout is shorter than that of other scorpionfish species. There are either no cirri above the eyes, or those that are present are markedly smaller than the eye. There are 12 spines and 9 soft rays in the dorsal fin and 3 spines and 5 soft rays in the anal fin. There is a pretympanic spine, no other species of Scorpaenopsis scorpionfish has this feature, this is connected by a low ridge to the postocular spine, a feature absent in juveniles. This species is quite fifficult to identify and is similar to other Scorpaenopsis scoprionfishes when observed in the wild. Thetassels on the lower jaw are shorter and finer, it has large scales with 43-50 scales along the lateral line. It frequently shows a white patch underneath and to the frontof the eye as well as a dark triangular patch below eye.

Distribution and habitat
Poss's scorpionfish has a wide Indo-Pacific distribution. It is found along the coast of eastern Africa from the Gulf of Suez to South Africa, the islands of the western Indian Ocean, the Maldives and Laccadive Islands, the islands of the eastern Andaman Sea, through Indonesia east to French Polynesia and north to Japan. It is absent from the southwestern Pacific and Fiji where it is replaced by S. eschmeyeri.

Biology
Poss's scorpionfish is an ambush predator that waits for smaller fishes to come into reach. They are typically solitary. This species has venomous spines in its fins.

See also 
 List of marine aquarium fish species

References

External links
 

Poss's scorpionfish
Taxa named by John Ernest Randall
Taxa named by William N. Eschmeyer
Fish described in 2001